999 Peachtree is a high-rise class A office building in midtown Atlanta, Georgia. Built in 1987 by Heery Architects and Engineers, the building is situated on the Midtown Mile, at the intersection of Peachtree Street and Tenth Street.

History 
The building was designed in 1985/86 by Heery Architects and Engineers, with John Cheek as the project architect and Joe Gottardy as the lead mechanical engineer. Construction was completed in 1987. Originally called First Union Plaza, the building served as the headquarters for First Union National Bank of Georgia, which later merged into First Union. In 1988 the Atlanta-based law firm Sutherland Asbill & Brennan LLP moved into the location, where they have remained to the current day. In February 2007, the property was purchased by Jamestown L.P. The next year, Jamestown hired Cousins Properties to manage the property. In 2010, Empire State South, a restaurant owned by restaurateur Hugh Acheson, opened in the building. Jamestown later sold the property in 2013 to Franklin Street Properties for $157.9 million. Shortly after the purchase, Franklin announced that Hines Interests Limited Partnership had been chosen to manage the property. In 2019, the building received LEED Platinum certification from the U.S. Green Building Council. 999 Peachtree was purchased from Franklin and is presently owned by Piedmont Office Realty Trust.

References

External links 
 999 Peachtree Street on the Piedmont Office Realty Trust website

Skyscraper office buildings in Atlanta
Buildings and structures completed in 1987
1987 establishments in Georgia (U.S. state)